The 2021 Las Vegas Aces season was the franchise's 25th season in the Women's National Basketball Association (WNBA) and the 4th year the franchise was based in Las Vegas. The regular season tipped off on May 15, 2021 at the Seattle Storm.

The Aces started the season by splitting a two game set in Seattle in a rematch of last year's finals.  After that set, they won four of their remaining five games in May, with their only other loss coming against Connecticut.  They lost their opening game in June, but went on a five game winning streak from there.  The streak was snapped in Minnesota, in overtime, in a one point loss to the Lynx.  The Aces followed the loss with an overtime win against Seattle to finish out June 7–2.  They carried their winning streak into July, winning the first two games of July.  The streak was snapped, again in overtime, by the Mercury.  They rounded out July with a loss and a win to finish 3–2 in the month.  The Aces went into the Olympic break with a 15–6 overall record.  They returned from the break with a 4–1 record in August, with the loss to the Sun surrounded by two wins.  They closed out the season with a 5–1 record in September, including a four game winning streak.  They finished the season with a 24–8 overall record, which earned the team the second seed in the 2021 WNBA Playoffs.  24 wins tied their franchise record for regular season wins with 2008.

As the second seed, the Aces earned a double bye into the Semifinals, and awaited the highest remaining seed from the Second Round.  After the games of the First and Second Round, the highest remaining seed was the Phoenix Mercury.  The Aces had home court advantage in the series, but lost two of their home games, despite a 13–3 home record in the regular season.  The Aces couldn't win Game 5 at home, losing by three to end the series and their season.

Transactions

WNBA draft 

The Aces made the following selections in the 2021 WNBA draft.

Trades and Roster Changes

Roster

Game log

Preseason

|- style="background:#fcc;"
| 1
| May 2
| Los Angeles Sparks
| L 71–80
| colspan=3 | Scrimmage
| Michelob Ultra ArenaNo Fans
| 0–1
|- style="background:#ffc"
| 2
| May 8
| @ Los Angeles Sparks
| T 85–85
| Liz Cambage (21)
| Dearica Hamby (9)
| WilsonYoungGrayPlum (3)
| Los Angeles Convention CenterNo Fans
| 0–1–1

Regular season

|- style="background:#fcc"
| 1
| May 15
| @ Seattle Storm
| L 83–97
| A'ja Wilson (24)
| Dearica Hamby (9)
| PlumWilliamsWilsonYoung (4)
| Angel of the Winds Arena1,031
| 0–1
|- style="background:#bbffbb;"
| 2
| May 18
| @ Seattle Storm
| W 96–80
| Jackie Young (21)
| A'ja Wilson (11)
| Chelsea Gray (7)
| Angel of the Winds Arena1,001
| 1–1
|- style="background:#bbffbb;"
| 3
| May 21
| Los Angeles Sparks
| W 97–69
| Chelsea Gray (18)
| HambyCambage (10)
| Chelsea Gray (6)
| Michelob Ultra Arena1,972
| 2–1
|- style="background:#fcc"
| 4
| May 23
| Connecticut Sun
| L 65–72
| A'ja Wilson (14)
| CambageWilson (7)
| Chelsea Gray (5)
| Michelob Ultra Arena1,954
| 2–2
|- style="background:#bbffbb;"
| 5
| May 26
| @ Phoenix Mercury
| W 85–79
| Jackie Young (27)
| A'ja Wilson (9)
| Chelsea Gray (9)
| Phoenix Suns Arena4,082
| 3–2
|- style="background:#bbffbb;"
| 6
| May 28
| Indiana Fever
| W 113–77
| Dearica Hamby (25)
| Liz Cambage (7)
| Chelsea Gray (12)
| Michelob Ultra ArenaN/A
| 4–2
|- style="background:#bbffbb;"
| 7
| May 30
| Indiana Fever
| W 101–78
| Dearica Hamby (22)
| Liz Cambage (13)
| Chelsea Gray (5)
| Michelob Ultra Arena1,981
| 5–2

|- style="background:#fcc;"
| 8
| June 1
| @ Connecticut Sun
| L 67–74
| Liz Cambage (28)
| Liz Cambage (7)
| A'ja Wilson (6)
| Mohegan Sun Arena N/A
| 5–3
|- style="background:#bbffbb;"
| 9
| June 3
| @ New York Liberty
| W 94–82
| A'ja Wilson (30)
| A'ja Wilson (13)
| Chelsea Gray (9)
| Barclays Center1,389
| 6–3
|- style="background:#bbffbb;"
| 10
| June 5
| @ Washington Mystics
| W 96–93
| Liz Cambage (24)
| A'ja Wilson (15)
| Chelsea Gray (8)
| Entertainment and Sports Arena2,100
| 7–3
|- style="background:#bbffbb;"
| 11
| June 13
| Dallas Wings
| W 85–78
| A'ja Wilson (28)
| A'ja Wilson (14)
| Jackie Young (5)
| Michelob Ultra ArenaNo Fans
| 8–3
|- style="background:#bbffbb;"
| 12
| June 15
| New York Liberty
| W 100–78
| Kelsey Plum (32)
| Liz Cambage (11)
| GrayYoung (5)
| Michelob Ultra Arena2,115
| 9–3
|- style="background:#bbffbb;"
| 13
| June 17
| New York Liberty
| W 103–76
| Kelsey Plum (18)
| Dearica Hamby (12)
| Kelsey Plum (7)
| Michelob Ultra ArenaNo Fans
| 10–3
|- style="background:#fcc;"
| 14
| June 25
| @ Minnesota Lynx
| L 89–90 (OT)
| A'ja Wilson (28)
| Liz Cambage (20)
| Chelsea Gray (7)
| Target Center2,734
| 10–4
|- style="background:#bbffbb;"
| 15
| June 27
| Seattle Storm
| W 95–92 (OT)
| A'ja Wilson (22)
| A'ja Wilson (11)
| Chelsea Gray (7)
| Michelob Ultra Arena3,766
| 11–4
|- style="background:#bbffbb;"
| 16
| June 30
| @ Los Angeles Sparks
| W 99–75
| Jackie Young (18)
| Liz Cambage (11)
| Chelsea Gray (8)
| Los Angeles Convention Center746
| 12–4

|- style="background:#bbffbb;"
| 17
| July 2
| @ Los Angeles Sparks
| W 66–58
| A'ja Wilson (20)
| A'ja Wilson (10)
| Chelsea Gray (4)
| Los Angeles Convention Center959
| 13–4
|- style="background:#bbffbb;"
| 18
| July 4
| Atlanta Dream
| W 118–95
| Kelsey Plum (23)
| CambageHamby (10)
| Kelsey Plum (8)
| Michelob Ultra Arena2,705
| 14–4
|- style="background:#fcc"
| 19
| July 7
| Phoenix Mercury
| L 90–99 (OT)
| A'ja Wilson (25)
| A'ja Wilson (12)
| GrayWilson (6)
| Michelob Ultra Arena3,013
| 14–5
|- style="background:#fcc"
| 20
| July 9
| Minnesota Lynx
| L 67–77
| Kelsey Plum (18)
| Kiah Stokes (12)
| Chelsea Gray (5)
| Michelob Ultra ArenaNo Fans
| 14–6
|- style="background:#bbffbb;"
| 21
| July 11
| @ Dallas Wings
| W 95–79
| HambyWilson (22)
| A'ja Wilson (13)
| A'ja Wilson (8)
| College Park Center2,533
| 15–6

|- style="background:#bbffbb;"
| 22
| August 15
| Washington Mystics
| W 84–83
| A'ja Wilson (20)
| A'ja Wilson (14)
| Chelsea Gray (11)
| Michelob Ultra Arena3,024
| 16–6
|- style="background:#bbffbb;"
| 23
| August 17
| Washington Mystics
| W 93–83
| Kelsey Plum (24)
| A'ja Wilson (14)
| PlumWilson (5)
| Michelob Ultra Arena3,241
| 17–6
|- style="background:#fcc"
| 24
| August 24
| @ Connecticut Sun
| L 62–76
| Chelsea Gray (15)
| CamgabeWilliams (6)
| Jackie Young (5)
| Mohegan Sun Arena4,012
| 17–7
|- style="background:#bbffbb;"
| 25
| August 26
| @ Atlanta Dream
| W 78–71
| A'ja Wilson (21)
| A'ja Wilson (12)
| Kelsey Plum (8)
| Gateway Center Arena2,182
| 18–7
|- style="background:#bbffbb;"
| 26
| August 28
| @ Indiana Fever
| W 87–71
| Riquna Williams (15)
| Liz Cambage (9)
| GrayPlum (6)
| Indiana Farmers ColiseumN/A
| 19–7

|- style="background:#bbffbb;"
| 27
| September 2
| Chicago Sky
| W 90–83
| PlumWilliamsWilson (21)
| Kiah Stokes (13)
| Chelsea Gray (5)
| Michelob Ultra ArenaN/A
| 20–7
|- style="background:#fcc"
| 28
| September 5
| @ Chicago Sky
| L 84–92
| Kelsey Plum (23)
| A'ja Wilson (12)
| Chelsea Gray (5)
| Wintrust Arena5,210
| 20–8
|- style="background:#bbffbb;"
| 29
| September 8
| Minnesota Lynx
| W 102–81
| Jackie Young (29)
| Jackie Young (10)
| Chelsea Gray (14)
| Michelob Ultra Arena5,663
| 21–8
|- style="background:#bbffbb;"
| 30
| September 13
| Dallas Wings
| W 85–75
| Kelsey Plum (30)
| A'ja Wilson (12)
| Kelsey Plum (5)
| Michelob Ultra ArenaN/A
| 22–8
|- style="background:#bbffbb;"
| 31
| September 17
| @ Chicago Sky
| W 103–70
| Riquna Williams (22)
| Kiah Stokes (13)
| StokesWilson (7)
| Wintrust Arena4,911
| 23–8
|- style="background:#bbffbb;"
| 32
| September 19
| @ Phoenix Mercury
| W 84–83
| Kelsey Plum (23)
| Jackie Young (7)
| Jackie Young (4)
| Phoenix Suns Arena9,724
| 24–8

Playoffs 

|- style="background:#bbffbb;"
| 1
| September 28
| Phoenix
| W 96–90
| Riquna Williams (26)
| A'ja Wilson (9)
| Chelsea Gray (12)
| Michelob Ultra Arena7,009
| 1–0
|- style="background:#fcc;"
| 2
| September 30
| Phoenix
| L 91–117
| Kelsey Plum (25)
| A'ja Wilson (9)
| GrayWilson (7)
| Michelob Ultra Arena6,432
| 1–1
|- style="background:#fcc;"
| 3
| October 3
| @ Phoenix
| L 60–87
| Liz Cambage (13)
| Dearica Hamby (7)
| Jackie Young (3)
| Desert Financial Arena7,090
| 1–2
|- style="background:#bbffbb;"
| 4
| October 6
| @ Phoenix
| W 93–76
| Chelsea Gray (22)
| A'ja Wilson (12)
| GrayPlum (6)
| Footprint Center11,255
| 2–2
|- style="background:#fcc;"
| 5
| October 8
| Phoenix
| L 84–87
| GrayPlum (22)
| Liz Cambage (11)
| Chelsea Gray (6)
| Michelob Ultra Arena9,680
| 2–3

Standings

Playoffs

Statistics

Source:

Regular Season

Awards and honors

References

External links 
 Official website of the Las Vegas Aces

Las Vegas Aces
Las Vegas Aces seasons
Las Vegas Aces